Cardinal is a Canadian crime drama television series, which was first broadcast on January 25, 2017, on CTV (in English) and Super Écran (in French). The series adapts the novels of crime writer Giles Blunt, focusing on police detective John Cardinal (Billy Campbell) and his partner Lise Delorme (Karine Vanasse), who investigate crimes in the fictional city of Algonquin Bay.

Across six episodes, the first season adapts the first John Cardinal novel Forty Words for Sorrow (2000), which focuses on the investigation of the murder of a young girl. On February 28, 2017, CTV renewed Cardinal for a second and third season, each containing six episodes. The second season adapts Blunt's third Cardinal novel, Blackfly Season, while the third adapted the novels By the Time You Read This and Crime Machine, the fourth and fifth novels in the series. The fourth and final season adapts the sixth novel, Until the Night.

Premise

Season 1: Forty Words for Sorrow
John Cardinal (Billy Campbell) is a troubled and brooding police officer in Algonquin Bay, who was removed from the homicide squad as a result of chief Noelle Dyson's (Kristen Thomson) belief that he had become obsessed with his investigation of a missing Native Canadian girl. When the girl's body finally turns up, he is reassigned to the case with a new partner, Lise Delorme (Karine Vanasse). What he does not know is that Delorme has been assigned to investigate him as part of a corruption probe that has identified Cardinal as possibly collaborating with a local drug dealer. The investigation widens when another missing person case with similar patterns leads Cardinal to believe that a serial killer may be active in the area.

Season 2: Blackfly Season
A young woman suffering from amnesia after having been shot in the head appears in Algonquin Bay. Soon mutilated bodies, in accordance with some occult religious rituals, are discovered. The bodies are members of a local group of bikers known for trafficking drugs. John Cardinal and the team suspect that someone is trying to replace the gang in the drug trade. The mental health of his wife still worries him. Musgrave thinks he has finally found the evidence he is looking for.

Season 3: By the Time You Read This
The suspicious death of Cardinal's wife Catherine coincides with a double murder, and Delorme is ordered to take the lead in the murder investigation. Reluctant to believe that Catherine committed suicide, Cardinal begins investigating other possibilities, whilst dealing with a succession of anonymous letters blaming him for the event. Noelle Dyson, recovering from the death of her sister, tries to reason with another prospective suicide and is devastated when she fails to prevent him killing himself.

Season 4: Until the Night 
After a prominent politician's husband is abducted and then left to die from exposure, Cardinal and Delorme suspect that a hired killer is targeting those close to four people, out of revenge for a cover-up in their past. Cardinal and Delorme grow closer but this case will be their last together as Delorme takes a new job in Toronto.

Cast and characters

Main
 Billy Campbell as Det. John Cardinal
 Karine Vanasse as Det. Lise Delorme
 Kristen Thomson as Det. Sgt. Noelle Dyson 
 Deborah Hay as Catherine Cardinal (Seasons 1–3)
 Alanna Bale as Kelly Cardinal
 Glen Gould as Det. Jerry Commanda
 James Downing as Det. Ian McLeod
 Zach Smadu as Det. Ash Kular (Season 2 – present)
 Eric Hicks as Const. Derek K. Fox
 David Richmond-Peck as Sgt. Malcolm Musgrave (Seasons 1–2)
 James Thomas as Det. Hannam (Season 1)

Recurring

Introduced in season one

 Brendan Fletcher as Eric Fraser
 Allie MacDonald as Edie Soames
 Robert Naylor as Keith London
 Gail Maurice as Dorothy Pine
 Conrad Coates as Coroner Barnhouse
 Fiona Highet as Tammy Lidstrom
 Trenna Keating as Kristin Baldwin
 Lawrence Bayne as Francis
 Gord Rand as Woody 
 Alden Adair as Josh
 Kelly Van der Burg as Margo 
 Dylan Colton as Todd Curry

Introduced in season two

 Bruce Ramsay as Ray Northwind
 Alex Paxton-Beesley as Red 
 Jonathan Keltz as Kevin Tait
 Dan Petronijevic as Leon
 Kris Holden-Ried as Lasalle
 Kevin Hanchard as Det. Sgt. Alan Clegg
 Brock Morgan as Toof 
 Kathryn Alexandre as Abby Harris
 Nicolette Pearse as Rachel Wells 
 Greg Hovanessian as Zack 
 Asivak Koostachin as Jordan Akiwenzie 
 Stephen Ouimette as Dr. Bell

Introduced in season three

 Aaron Ashmore as Randall Wishart 
 Susan Coyne as Helen Bell 
 Sophia Lauchlin Hirt as Nikki 
 Tom Jackson as Lloyd Kreeger
 Rya Kihlstedt as Sharlene Winston 
 Jennifer Podemski as Wendy Duchene 
 Alex Ozerov as Jack 
 Nick Serino as Lemur
 Devery Jacobs as Sam Duchene

Introduced in season four

 Carmen Moore as Sheila Gagne
 Shawn Doyle as Scott Riley 
 Linda Goranson as Adele
 Currie Graham as Neil Cuthbert

Episodes

Season 1: Forty Words for Sorrow (2017)

Season 2: Blackfly Season (2018)

Season 3: By the Time You Read This (2019)

Season 4: Until the Night (2020)

Production
The first season was directed by Daniel Grou, and produced by Sienna Films and eOne Entertainment. It commenced production in Sudbury, Ontario in February 2016, with some additional location filming taking place in North Bay, Nipissing First Nation and Atikameksheng Anishnawbek. The first season was given a production budget of $1,800,000 per episode. Locations included the former studios of CBC Northern Ontario and the North Bay Public Library, which served as the Algonquin Bay police station.

The second season was directed by Jeff Renfroe, and was produced primarily in North Bay.

The show's theme music is adapted from the song "Familiar" by Danish singer-songwriter Agnes Obel. Background music featured in the series is composed by Toronto-based Todor Kobakov.

Vanasse, who is Québécoise and had previously appeared in the American television series Pan Am and Revenge, commented that Cardinal is the first time in which she is playing a Québécoise rather than a European character in an English-language television programme.

International transmission
Episodes from the second season premiered a day in advance of their television broadcast on on-demand service Crave TV. Filming on the third season completed in July 2018, and the season began airing on January 24, 2019. The fourth and final season was broadcast in 2020 with its finale airing on May 11, 2020.

In the United Kingdom the series was broadcast on BBC Four for the first three seasons and BBC Two for the last season. It was broadcast on C More in Scandinavia, Calle 13 in Spain, Hulu in the United States, SBS in Australia, Magenta TV in Germany, Canvas in Belgium and Channel 11 in Israel. In Brazil, the TV series premiered on Universal+, streaming belonged to Universal TV, NBCUniversal's channel.

Reception
John Doyle of The Globe and Mail praised the series, calling it "a gripping, superbly made crime drama" which ultimately lands as "landmark Canadian TV".

The series received 12 Canadian Screen Award nominations at the 6th Canadian Screen Awards in 2018. It won six awards, including Best Actor in a Limited Program or Television Film (Campbell), Best Supporting Actress in a Drama Program (Macdonald), Photography in a Drama Series (Steve Cosens), Editing in a Drama Series (Teresa De Luca), Music in a Fiction Program or Series (Todor Kobakov) and Best Casting (Jon Comerford and Lisa Parasyn).

At the 7th Canadian Screen Awards in 2019, the series won the awards for Best Limited Series, Best Lead Actor in a Drama Program or Limited Series (Campbell), Best Lead Actress in a Drama Program or Limited Series (Vanasse), Best Editing in a Dramatic Program or Series (Matthew Anas), Best Direction in a Dramatic Program or Mini-series (Renfroe), Best Music in a Fiction Production (Kobakov) and Best Writing in a Dramatic Program or Mini-series (Sarah Dodd for the episode "Red").

References

External links

 

CTV Television Network original programming
Television shows filmed in Greater Sudbury
2017 Canadian television series debuts
2020 Canadian television series endings
2010s Canadian crime drama television series
Television shows set in Ontario
Northern Ontario in fiction
Television shows based on Canadian novels
Gemini and Canadian Screen Award for Best Television Film or Miniseries winners
2020s Canadian crime drama television series
Gemini and Canadian Screen Award for Best Drama Series winners
Television shows filmed in North Bay, Ontario